The 1990 Kent State Golden Flashes football team was an American football team that represented Kent State University in the Mid-American Conference (MAC) during the 1990 NCAA Division I-A football season. In their third and final season under head coach Dick Crum, the Golden Flashes compiled a 2–9 record (2–6 against MAC opponents), finished in a tie for seventh place in the MAC, and were outscored by all opponents by a combined total of 328 to 177.

The team's statistical leaders included Marcus Haywood with 672 rushing yards, Joe Dalpra with 1,533 passing yards, and Shawn Barnes with 483 receiving yards.

Schedule

References

Kent State
Kent State Golden Flashes football seasons
Kent State Golden Flashes football